The following is an incomplete list of current and defunct magazines published in Mexico. They are published in Spanish or other languages.

# 
15 a 20
24xSegundo
4 Ruedas Magazine

A

A Quien Corresponda
 Actual
¡Alarma!
Almas
Alto Nivel
Arqueología Mexicana
Arquine
Artes de México
Atomix
Automóvil Panamericano

B
Bazar Gráfico
Bitácora
Buenhogar

C

Cabo Living
Los Cabos Magazine
Campo Bravo
Casas & Gente
Chilango
Cine Premiere
Cinemanía
Clara
Club Nintendo
Contenido
 La Correa Feminista
Creativa

D

De 15 a 20
 Debate Feminista
Día Siete
Drik
DYN

E

El Hijo del Ahuizote
Electrónica y Servicio
Entorno
Época
Eres
Eres Novia
eSemanal
Etcétera
Expansión

F

Fahrenheit
Fem
Fotozoom
Furia Musical

G
Gatopardo
Gefao

H

H Para Hombres
Haz Negocio
 Hoy

I
Inkubo Magazine

J
Jueves de Excélsior
 Jose maria carpizo sanchez biografia

L
Luchas

M

Matiz
Max
Maxim en Español
Men's Health
MEOW Magazine
México Desconocido
México Volitivo
Mujer Ejecutiva
Mujer Nueva
Mundo Ejecutivo
Mundo Minero
Muy Interesante

N

Neo
Nexos
Noche
La Nota México
Notas Fiscales
Notas Para Ti

O
Observer Magazine
 Open
 Ocean Blue Magazine

P

Papel de Literatura
Planeta X
Proceso
El Publicista

R
 Replicante

Q
Quien
Quo

R

Radiador Magazine
Raíces
Rebelde
Red
Replicante
Revista Adhoc
Revista ERES
Revista Telemundo

S

Salud Mental
Ser Mamá
Siempre!
Soy Entrepreneur
Switch

T

Tiempo Libre
Todo
Transportes y Turismo
Tritón
TV Notas
TV y Novelas

U

Undo magazine
Usa-Mex Infobusiness

V
Veintitantos
Vértigo
 Vuelta

W, X, Y, Z

Zeta

See also
 List of Mexican newspapers

References

Mexico
Magazines